Parathectis is a genus of moth in the family Gelechiidae.

Species
 Parathectis farinata (Meyrick, 1913)
 Parathectis sordidula (Meyrick, 1913)

References

Gelechiini